Jason Young (born 21 March 1991) is a Jamaican sprinter, competing in the 100 metres and 200 metres.

Jason is a student at University of the West Indies, Mona and won a joint silver medal in the 200 m  at the 2011 Summer Universiade.

Young attracted attention in July 2012 when he set a massive new personal best of 19.86 s in the 200 metres at the Spitzen Leichtathletik meeting in Lucerne, beating Warren Weir. Earlier in the evening he had set a new personal best of 10.06 s in the 100 metres.

References

External links

Jason Young page at Racers Track Club

1991 births
Living people
Jamaican male sprinters
Universiade medalists in athletics (track and field)
Universiade silver medalists for Jamaica
Medalists at the 2011 Summer Universiade